Coucke is a Flemish surname. Variant spellings include Coeke, Coeck, Couck, and Koeck; it may also be seen in the genitive forms Coeckx and Koeken. The surname was first recorded in the 14th century; it is an occupational surname for a maker of cakes (i.e. a pastry chef).

People with the surname
Coeck
Ludo Coeck (1955–1985), Belgian football player
Inge Coeck (born 1965), Belgian sprint canoer

Coecke
Pieter Coecke van Aelst (1502–1550), Flemish painter
Bob Coecke (born 1968), Belgian-born British physicist

Couck
Lize Marke (born Liliane Couck, 1936), Belgian singer

Coucke
Jan Coucke (c. 1812–1860), Flemish victim of judicial error
Valerius Coucke (1888–1951), Belgian scholar and priest
René Coucke (born 1938), Belgian painter and sculptor
Marc Coucke (born 1965), Belgian businessman
Maëva Coucke (born 1994), Miss France 2018

References